Tuklęcz  is a village in the administrative district of Gmina Rytwiany, within Staszów County, Świętokrzyskie Voivodeship, in south-central Poland.

The village has a population of  360.

Demography 
In 2002, there were 388 people residing in Tuklęcz village, of whom 47.9% were male and 52.1% were female. In the village, age groups were well distributed, with 26.8% under the age of 18, 33% from 18 to 44, 17.5% from 45 to 64, and 22.7% who were 65 years of age or older.
 Figure 1. Population pyramid of village in 2002 — by age group and sex

References

Villages in Staszów County